The Last Word in Lonesome is an album by American country music singer Eddy Arnold. It was released by RCA Victor in 1966. The music was arranged and conducted by Bill Walker. Chet Atkins was the producer.

The album debuted on Billboard magazine's Top Country Albums chart on July 30, 1966, peaked at No. 1, and remained on the chart for a total of 26 weeks.

AllMusic gave the album a rating of three stars. Reviewer Greg Adams wrote: "If country music was moving uptown in the '60s, The Last Word in Lonesome saw it comfortably ensconced in a Manhattan penthouse, sipping champagne and bragging about its golf scores."

Track listing
Side A
 "Misty Blue"
 "Here Comes My Baby"
 "Why"
 "Long, Long Friendship"
 "That's a Lie"
 "A Thing Called Sadness"

Side B
 "The Last Word in Lonesome Is Me" (Roger Miller)
 "Don't Touch Me"
 "The Other Side of Lonely"
 "My Home Town Sweetheart"
 "Millions of Roses"
 "After the Laughter (Comes the Tears)"

References

1966 albums
RCA Victor albums
Eddy Arnold albums